Biblica is an academic journal published by the Pontifical Biblical Institute. The editor-in-chief is Dean Béchard.

References

External links 
 

Biblical studies journals
Publications established in 1920
Quarterly journals
Multilingual journals